Jorge Luis Rojas Mendoza (born 7 January 1993) is a Paraguayan international footballer who plays professionally for Paraguayan club Club Olimpia on loan from Querétaro as a winger. He also plays for the Paraguay national team, having made his debut in 2012.

Club career
Born in Concepción, Rojas began his career with Cerro Porteño.

In April 2013, he signed a 5-year contract with Portuguese club Benfica, joining at the start of the 2013–14 season. After playing for Benfica B in the Segunda Liga, he was loaned to Belenenses in January 2014 for the rest of the season. On 8 July 2014, Rojas was loaned to Argentine club Gimnasia LP until December 2015. He made 51 appearances and scored 5 goals for Gimnasia between July 2014 and December 2015. Upon his arrival back to Benfica he was again sent out on loan as he joined former club Cerro Porteño. In January 2019 he signed for Mexican club Querétaro.

International career
Rojas has made 16 appearances and scored once for Paraguay. He played in 12 games and scored 3 goals for Paraguay U20s, with them coming at the 2013 South American Youth Football Championship and 2013 FIFA U-20 World Cup.

Club statistics

Honours
Cerro Porteño
Paraguayan Primera División Apertura: 2012
Paraguayan Primera División Clausura: 2013

References

External links
 
 

1993 births
Living people
Sportspeople from Asunción
Paraguayan footballers
Association football wingers
Cerro Porteño players
Paraguayan Primera División players
S.L. Benfica B players
Liga Portugal 2 players
C.F. Os Belenenses players
Querétaro F.C. footballers
Club Tijuana footballers
Primeira Liga players
Club de Gimnasia y Esgrima La Plata footballers
Argentine Primera División players
Liga MX players
Paraguayan expatriate footballers
Paraguay international footballers
Paraguayan expatriate sportspeople in Portugal
Expatriate footballers in Portugal
Paraguayan expatriate sportspeople in Argentina
Expatriate footballers in Argentina
Paraguayan expatriate sportspeople in Mexico
Expatriate footballers in Mexico